Mia Golam Parwar is a Bangladesh Jamaat-e-Islami politician and the former Member of Parliament of Khulna-5. He was elected as Secretary General of the Party for the 2020-2022 session.

Career
Parwar was elected to parliament from Khulna-5 as a Bangladesh Jamaat-e-Islami candidate in 2001.

Recently, he was elected as the Secretary General of the Bangladesh Jamaat-e-Islami for the party's 2020–2022 electoral session.

References

Bangladesh Jamaat-e-Islami politicians
Living people
8th Jatiya Sangsad members
People from Khulna District
Year of birth missing (living people)